Tony or Anthony Martino may refer to:

Anthony A. Martino (1933–2008), American auto mechanic and entrepreneur
Tony Martino (Canadian football) (born 1966), Canadian Football League punter and placekicker 
Tony Martino (singer) American singer-songwriter, musician and independent record label owner-producer
Tony Martino (ice hockey) (born 1964), Canadian CHL goalie in 1992–93 CHL season

See also
Tony Martin (disambiguation)
Martino (disambiguation)